Ridings FM was a local radio station serving the Wakefield District of West Yorkshire. The station was folded into Greatest Hits Radio Yorkshire, as part of a rebrand, on 1 September 2020.

Studios
The station was originally based at Thornes Office Park in Wakefield before co-locating with sister station Dearne FM at Zenith Park on Whaley Road, Barugh Green, in the north-west of Barnsley in 2009.

Following a memorandum sent to Ofcom, which stated that the station had never made a profit although being a technical success, Ridings FM was moved to Doncaster where it shared a building with Trax FM, Dearne FM and Rother FM.

Transmission
The station's transmitter was located at Wakefield House in Wakefield city centre. Ridings FM broadcast on 106.8 FM on 500 watts of power. From July 2001, it was made available on the Bauer Leeds DAB multiplex. This service was discontinued in 2013 as it was a significant cost and covered areas outside of Wakefield with an uneconomically small potential audience.

FM licence
Prior to being awarded the Wakefield licence, the station ran a trial service which ran from 11 October 1997 on 87.7 FM.

By the closing date of 8 September 1998, WF 107 Ltd (based in Wakefield), Henna FM Ltd (based in Batley providing Asian music) and Ridings FM had applied to the Radio Authority for the licence. Ridings FM was later awarded the licence on 7 January 1999.

Programming
The station's output included a weekday breakfast show. The station's news team won a Sony Bronze award in May 2000. At off peak times the station used the feed from Independent Radio News. As well as news, Ridings FM covered local sports teams from the Wakefield Trinity, Castleford Tigers and Featherstone Rovers in rugby league, to Ossett United (amalgamation of Ossett Albion and Ossett Town) and Frickley Athletic in football.

Presenters

During Ridings FM's lifetime, presenters included:

 Phil Butler
 Gareth Webb
 Paul Bromley
 John Tolson
 Jamie Fletcher
 Chris Hubbard
 Kev Wilson
 Andy Hoyle

References

External links
 History of local radio in Yorkshire
 The Student Wiki
 Receiving the licence in January 1999

Radio stations established in 1999
Radio stations in Yorkshire
Organisations based in Wakefield
Bauer Radio
1999 establishments in England